Maruti Suzuki India Limited, formerly known as Maruti Udyog Limited, is an Indian automobile manufacturer, based in New Delhi. It was founded in 1981 and owned by the Government of India until 2003, when it was sold to the Japanese automaker Suzuki Motor Corporation. As of September 2022 Maruti Suzuki has a market share of 42 percent in the Indian passenger car market.

History

Maruti Udyog Limited was founded by the Government of India on 24 Jan 1981 with Suzuki Motor Corporation as a minor partner, only to become the formal JV partner and license holder of Suzuki in August 2021. The first manufacturing factory of Maruti was established in Gurugram, Haryana, in the same year.

Chronology
Affiliation with Suzuki 
In 1982, a license and joint venture agreement (JVA) was signed between Maruti Udyog Ltd., and Suzuki of Japan. At first, Maruti Suzuki was mainly an importer of cars. In India's closed market, Maruti received the right to import 2 fully built-up Suzuki in the first two years, and even after that, the early goal was to use only 33% indigenous parts. This upset the local manufacturers considerably. There were some concerns that the Indian market was too small to absorb the comparatively large production planned by Maruti Suzuki, with the government even considering adjusting the petrol tax and lowering the excise duty in order to boost sales. Local production commenced in December 1983 with the introduction of the SS30/SS40 Suzuki Fronte/Alto-based Maruti 800. In 1984, the Maruti Van with the same three-cylinder engine as the 800 was released and the installed capacity of the plant in Gurgaon reached 40,000 units.

In 1985, the Suzuki SJ410-based Gypsy a 970 cc 4WD off-road vehicle, was launched. In 1986, the original 800 was replaced by an all-new model of the 796 cc hatchback Suzuki Alto (SS80), and the 100,000th vehicle was produced by the company. In 1987, the company started exporting to western markets, when a lot of 500 cars were sent to Hungary. By 1988, the capacity of the Gurgaon plant was increased to 100,000 units per annum.

Market liberalisation
In 1989, the Maruti 1000 was introduced and the 970 cc, three-box was India's first contemporary sedan. By 1991, 65 percent of the components, for all vehicles produced, were indigenized. After the liberalization of the Indian economy in 1991, Suzuki increased its stake in Maruti to 50 percent, making the company a 50-50 joint venture with the government of India as the other stakeholder.

In 1993, the Zen, a 993 cc engined hatchback was launched, and in 1994 the 1,298 cc Esteem sedan was introduced. Maruti produced its 1 millionth vehicle since the commencement of production in 1994. Maruti's second plant was opened with an annual capacity reaching 200,000 units. Maruti launched a 24-hour emergency on-road vehicle service. In 1998, the new Maruti 800 was released, being the first change in design since 1986. Zen D, a 1,527 cc diesel hatchback, Maruti's first diesel vehicle, and a redesigned Omni were introduced. In 1999, the 1.6-litre Maruti Baleno three-box sedan and Wagon R were also launched.

In 2000, Maruti became the first car company in India to launch a call center for internal and customer services. The new Alto model was released. In 2001, Maruti True Value, selling and buying used cars was launched. In October of the same year, the Maruti Versa was launched. In 2002, Esteem Diesel was introduced. Two new subsidiaries were also started: Maruti Insurance Distributor Services and Maruti Insurance Brokers Limited. Suzuki Motor Corporation increased its stake in Maruti to 54.2 percent.

In 2003, the new Suzuki Grand Vitara XL-7 was introduced while the Zen and the Wagon R were upgraded and redesigned. The four millionth Maruti vehicle was built and they entered into a partnership with the State Bank of India. Maruti Udyog Ltd. was listed on BSE and NSE after a public issue, which was oversubscribed tenfold. In 2004, the Alto became India's best-selling car overtaking the Maruti 800 after nearly two decades. The five-seater Versa 5-seater, a new variant, was created while the Esteem was re-launched. Maruti Udyog closed the financial year 2003–04 with an annual sale of 472,122 units, the highest ever since the company began operations, and the fiftieth lakh (5 millionth) car rolled out in April 2005. The 1.3-litre Suzuki Swift five-door hatchback was introduced in 2005.

In 2006 Suzuki and Maruti set up another joint venture, "Maruti Suzuki Automobiles India", to build two new manufacturing plants, one for vehicles and one for engines. Cleaner cars were also introduced, with several new models meeting the new Bharat Stage III emission standards. In February 2012, Maruti Suzuki sold its ten millionth vehicle in India. In July 2014 it had a market share of more than 45%. In May 2015, the company produced its fifteen millionth vehicle in India, a Swift Dzire.

On 25 April 2019, Maruti Suzuki announced that it would phase out production of diesel cars by 1 April 2020, when the Bharat Stage VI emission standards come into effect. The new standards would require a significant investment from the company to upgrade its existing diesel engines to comply with the more stringent emission standards. Chairman R.C. Bhargava stated, "We have taken this decision so that in 2022 we are able to meet the corporate average fuel efficiency (CAFE) norms and a higher share of CNG vehicles will help us comply with the norms. I hope the union government's policies will help grow the market for CNG vehicles." Diesel cars accounted for about 23 percent of Maruti Suzuki's annual sales.

The company plans to launch its first electric car in the second half of 2021, the Maruti Suzuki WagonR Electric, and a test mule of the same has been spotted several times recently.

Joint venture related issues
Relationship between the Government of India, under the United Front (India) coalition and Suzuki Motor Corporation over the joint venture was a point of heated debate in the Indian media until Suzuki Motor Corporation gained the controlling stake. This highly profitable joint venture that had a near monopolistic trade in the Indian automobile market and the nature of the partnership built up till then was the underlying reason for most issues. The success of the joint venture led Suzuki to increase its equity from 26% to 40% in 1987, and to 50% in 1992, and further to 56.21% as of 2013. In 1982, both the venture partners entered into an agreement to nominate their candidate for the post of Managing Director and every Managing Director would have a tenure of five years.

Manufacturing facilities
Maruti Suzuki has two manufacturing facilities in Haryana (Gurugram and Manesar), and one manufacturing complex in Gujarat wholly owned by parent company Suzuki which supplies its entire production to Maruti Suzuki. All manufacturing facilities have a combined production capacity of 2,250,000 vehicles annually (1.5 million from Maruti Suzuki's two plants and 750,000 from Suzuki Motor Gujarat).

The Gurgaon facilities also manufacture 240,000 K-Series engines annually. The Gurugram facility manufactures the Alto 800, WagonR, Ertiga, XL6, S-Cross, Vitara Brezza, Ignis, and Eeco. The Gurugram facility also assembles the Jimny starting from January 2021 solely for export markets. It was reported the Indian-assembled Jimny will be exported to African markets and countries in the Middle East.

Initially, it had a production capacity of 100,000 vehicles annually but this was increased to 300,000 vehicles annually in October 2008. The production capacity was further increased by 250,000 vehicles taking the total production capacity to 800,000 vehicles annually. The Manesar plant produces the Alto, Swift, Ciaz, Baleno and Celerio. On 25 June 2012, Haryana State Industries and Infrastructure Development Corporation demanded Maruti Suzuki pay an additional ₹235 crore for enhanced land acquisition for its Haryana plant expansion. The agency reminded Maruti that failure to pay the amount would lead to further proceedings and vacating the enhanced land acquisition.

In 2012, the company decided to merge Suzuki Powertrain India Limited (SPIL) with itself. SPIL was started as a JV by Suzuki Motor Corp. along with Maruti Suzuki. It has the facilities available for manufacturing diesel engines and transmissions. The demand for transmissions for all Maruti Suzuki cars is met by the production from SPIL.

In 2017, the new Suzuki Motor Gujarat facility was opened. This third facility is not owned by Maruti Suzuki, but instead wholly owned by Suzuki Motor Corporation. Despite that, the plant supplied vehicles to Maruti without any additional cost. Located in Hansalpur, Ahmedabad, the plant has a total annual capacity of 750,000 units.

In November 2021 Maruti Suzuki announce to set up of a big plant in IMT Kharkhoda in Sonipat district across 900 acres with an investment of ₹18,000 crores.

Haryana State Industrial and Infrastructure Development Corporation gives 900 acres of land to Maruti Suzuki for setting up a new plant in Industrial Model Township at Kharkhoda, Haryana.

In August 2022 Prime Minister of India Shri Narendra Modi lays foundation stone of Maruti Suzuki's new manufacturing plant in Kharkhoda. It will be one of the largest automobile manufacturing plant in World with capacity of making 1 million cars per year.

The new manufacturing facility in Kharkhoda, Haryana will have four manufacturing plants in which 10 lakh cars will be produced annually and the Kharkhoda, Haryana Plant will be third largest car producer facility in world.

Controversies

Industrial relations
Since its founding in 1983, Maruti Udyog Limited has experienced problems with its labour force. The Indian labour it hired readily accepted Japanese work culture and the modern manufacturing process. In 1997, there was a change in ownership, and Maruti became predominantly government controlled. Shortly thereafter, conflict between the United Front Government and Suzuki started. In 2000, a major industrial relations issue began and employees of Maruti went on an indefinite strike, demanding among other things, major revisions to their wages, incentives and pensions.

Employees used slowdown in October 2000, to press a revision to their incentive-linked pay. In parallel, after elections and a new central government led by NDA alliance, India pursued a disinvestment policy. Along with many other government owned companies, the new administration proposed to sell part of its stake in Maruti Suzuki in a public offering. The worker's union opposed this sell-off plan on the grounds that the company will lose a major business advantage of being subsidised by the Government, and the union has better protection while the company remains in control of the government.

The standoff between the union and the management continued through 2001. The management refused union demands citing increased competition and lower margins. The central government privatized Maruti in 2002 and Suzuki became the majority owner of Maruti Udyog Limited.

Manesar violence
On 18 July 2012, Maruti's Manesar plant was hit by violence. According to Maruti management, the production workers attacked supervisors and started a fire that killed company's General Manager of Human Resources Avineesh Dev and injured 100 other managers, including two Japanese expatriates. The workers also allegedly injured nine policemen. However Maruti Suzuki Workers Union (MSWU) President Sam Meher alleged that management ordered 300 hired security guards to attack the workforce during the violence. The incident is the worst-ever for Suzuki since the company began operations in India in 1983.

Since April 2012, the Manesar union had demanded a three-fold increase in basic salary, a monthly conveyance allowance of 10,000, a laundry allowance of 3,000, a gift with every new car launch, and a house for every worker who wants one, or cheaper home loans for those who want to build their own houses. According to the Maruti Suzuki Workers Union a supervisor had abused and made discriminatory comments to a low-caste worker, Jiya Lal. These claims were denied by the company and the police. Maruti said the unrest began, not over wage discussions, but after the workers' union demanded the reinstatement of Jiya Lal who had been suspended for allegedly beating a supervisor. The workers claim harsh working conditions and extensive hiring of low-paid contract workers which are paid about $126 a month, about half the minimum wage of permanent employees. On 27 June 2013, an international delegation from the International Commission for Labor Rights (ICLR) released a  report alleging serious violations of the industrial right of workers by the Maruti Suzuki management. Company executives denied harsh conditions and claim they hired entry-level workers on contracts and made them permanent as they gained experience. Maruti employees currently earn allowances in addition to their base wage.

The police, in its First Information Report (FIR), claimed on 21 July that Manesar violence is the result of a planned violence by a section of workers and union leaders and arrested 91 people. Maruti Suzuki in its statement on the unrest, announced that all work at the Manesar plant has been suspended indefinitely. The shut down of Manesar plant is leading to a loss of about ₹75 crore per day. On 21 July 2012, citing safety concerns, the company announced a lockout under The Industrial Disputes Act, 1947 pending results of an inquiry the company has requested of the Haryana government into the causes of the disorder. Under the provisions of The Industrial Disputes Act for wages, the report claimed, employees are expected to be paid for the duration of the lockout. On 26 July 2012, Maruti announced employees would not be paid for the period of lock-out in accordance with Indian labour laws. The company further announced that it will stop using contract workers by March 2013. The report claimed the salary difference between contract workers and permanent workers has been much smaller than initial media reports – the contract worker at Maruti received about 11,500 per month, while a permanent worker received about 12,500 a month at start, which increased in three years to 21,000-₹22,000 per month. In a separate report, a contractor who was providing contract employees to Maruti claimed the company gave its contract employees the best wage, allowances and benefits package in the region.

Shinzo Nakanishi, managing director and chief executive of Maruti Suzuki India, said this type of violence has never happened in Suzuki Motor Corp's global operations in Hungary, Indonesia, Spain, Pakistan, Thailand, Malaysia, China and the Philippines. Nakanishi apologised to affected workers on behalf of the company, and in press interview requested the central and Haryana state governments to help stop further violence by legislating decisive rules to restore corporate confidence amid emergence of this new 'militant workforce' in Indian factories. He announced, "we are going to de-recognise Maruti Suzuki Workers' Union and dismiss all workers named in connection with the incident. We will not compromise at all in such instances of barbaric, unprovoked violence." He also announced Maruti plans to continue manufacturing in Manesar, that Gujarat was an expansion opportunity and not an alternative to Manesar.

The company dismissed 500 workers accused of causing the violence and re-opened the plant on 21 August, saying it would produce 150 vehicles on the first day, less than 10% of its capacity. Analysts said that the shutdown was costing the company 1 billion rupees ($18 million) a day and costing the company market share. In July 2013, the workers went on hunger strike to protest the continuing jailing of their colleagues and launched an online campaign to support their demands.

A total of 148 workers were charged with the murder of Human Resources Manager Avineesh Dev. The court dismissed charges against 117 of the workers. On 17 March 2017, 31 workers were found guilty of variety of offences. 18 were convicted on charges of rioting, trespassing, causing hurt and other related offences under Indian Penal Code sections. The remaining 13 workers were sentenced to life in imprisonment after being found guilty of the murder of General Manager of Human Resources Avineesh Dev. Twelve of the thirteen sentenced were office-bearers of the Maruti Suzuki Workers Union at the time of the alleged offences. The prosecution had sought the death penalty for the thirteen.

Both prosecution and defence have announced they will appeal against the sentences. Defence counsel Vrinda Grover stated, "We will file appeals against all convictions in the HC. The evidence, as it stands, cannot withstand legal scrutiny. There is no evidence to link these workers to the murder. The 13 who have been convicted, it’s important to remember that they were the leaders of the union. Therefore, it is clear that this is targeted framing of these persons. We hope for justice in the superior court".

The Maruti Suzuki Workers Union is continuing to organise industrial action and protests calling for the workers to be released and criticising the judgement and sentences an unjust. An international appeal for the release of the workers has been made by the International Committee for the Fourth International (ICFI) and other organisations such as the People's Alliance for Democracy and Secularism.

Automotive safety
Maruti Suzuki's has been criticized for compromising safety in their products by automotive enthusiasts, journalists, and the Global NCAP, as they are made lighter in terms of kerb weight to achieving higher fuel economy. Starting 2014, several of their made for India cars were crash tested at Global NCAP, most of which have given disappointing results. Cars like Alto, Swift, Celerio, S-Presso (with driver's airbag), and Eeco which had no safety features like airbags were awarded 0 stars, while Wagon-R and Swift (2018 model year) which had dual front airbags were awarded 2 stars out of 5. Only the Vitara Brezza (4 stars) and Ertiga (3 stars) have been awarded decent safety ratings. Though Maruti Suzuki claimed that they were following the safety standards mandated by the Government of India, it however only implied with the safety features included in their cars and not the strong body shell or build quality which suffers the impact of the crash. Maruti Suzuki has also come under fire for discrimination with customers in India, by making cars safe meant for exports to European and African markets.

The chairman, RC Bhargava stated that "If carmakers incorporate such features in even entry-level cars, obviously the price would go up, which would lead consumers to opt for two-wheelers, which would be more unsafe", which attracted criticism. The company, in February 2020, decided not to send their cars to Global NCAP for testing, as they only believe in the Safety Standards set by the Government of India. Following the crash test results of S-Presso, Alejandro Furas, Secretary General of Global NCAP said, “It is very disappointing that Maruti Suzuki, the manufacturer with the largest share of the Indian market, offers such low safety performance for Indian consumers. Domestic manufacturers like Mahindra and Tata have demonstrated high levels of safety and protection for their customers, both achieving five star performance. Surely it’s time for Maruti Suzuki to demonstrate this commitment to safety for its customers?” Alongside, David Ward, President of the Towards Zero Foundation said, "We have seen important progress on car safety in India, with new legislation introduced by the government and manufacturers like Mahindra and Tata accepting the Global NCAP five star challenge and producing models which go well beyond minimum regulatory requirements. There is no place for zero rated cars in the Indian market. It remains a great disappointment that an important manufacturer like Maruti Suzuki does not recognize this."

Anti-competitive dealer policies 
In Aug 2021, Maruti Suzuki was fined ₹200 Crore (US$28.57 million) by the Competition Commission of India (CCI) for implementing its Discount Control Policy that restrains dealers from offering customer discounts beyond those prescribed by the carmaker.

Models

Current models

Discontinued models

Services

Sales and service network

Maruti Suzuki has 2,413 Arena sales outlets across 1,992 cities and 380 Nexa sales outlets across 228 cities in India. The company aims to increase its sales network to 4,000 outlets by 2020. It has 4044 service stations across 1,861 cities throughout India. Maruti's dealership network is larger than that of enough known companies combined. Service is a major revenue generator of the company. Most of the service stations are managed on franchise basis, where Maruti Suzuki trains the local staff. Also, The Express Service stations exist, sending across their repairman to the vehicle if it is away from a normal service center.

Nexa
In 2015, Maruti Suzuki launched Nexa, a new dealership network for its premium cars which stands for New Exclusive Automotive Experience.

Maruti Suzuki currently sells the Baleno, Grand Vitara, XL6, Ciaz and Ignis through Nexa outlets. S-Cross was the first car to be sold through Nexa outlets. Several new models will be added to both channels as part of the company's medium term goal of 2 million annual sales by 2020. The company recently achieved a milestone of selling 1.5 million cars from over 350 dealerships across the country and is the third largest automobile retail channel of India.

Maruti Insurance
Launched in 2002 Maruti Suzuki provides vehicle insurance to its customers with the help of the National Insurance Company, Bajaj Allianz, New India Assurance and Royal Sundaram. The service was set up the company with the inception of two subsidiaries Maruti Insurance Distributors Services Pvt. Ltd and Maruti Insurance Brokers Pvt. Limited

This service started as a benefit or value addition to customers and was able to ramp up easily. By December 2005 they were able to sell more than two million insurance policies since its inception.

Maruti Finance
To promote its bottom line growth, Maruti Suzuki launched Maruti Finance in January 2002. Prior to the start of this service Maruti Suzuki had started two joint ventures Citicorp Maruti and Maruti Countrywide with Citi Group and GE Countrywide respectively to assist its client in securing loan. Maruti Suzuki tied up with ABN Amro Bank, HDFC Bank, ICICI Limited, Kotak Mahindra, Standard Chartered Bank, and Sundaram to start this venture including its strategic partners in car finance. Again the company entered into a strategic partnership with SBI in March 2003 Since March 2003, Maruti has sold over 12,000 vehicles through SBI-Maruti Finance. SBI-Maruti Finance is currently available in 166 cities across India.

Citicorp Maruti Finance Limited is a joint venture between Citicorp Finance India and Maruti Udyog Limited its primary business stated by the company is "hire-purchase financing of Maruti Suzuki vehicles". Citi Finance India Limited is a wholly owned subsidiary of Citibank Overseas Investment Corporation, Delaware, which in turn is a 100% wholly owned subsidiary of Citibank N.A. Citi Finance India Limited holds 74% of the stake and Maruti Suzuki holds the remaining 26%. GE Capital, HDFC and Maruti Suzuki came together in 1995 to form Maruti Countrywide. Maruti claims that its finance program offers most competitive interest rates to its customers, which are lower by 0.25% to 0.5% from the market rates.

Maruti TrueValue
Maruti True service offered by Maruti Suzuki to its customers. It is a marketplace for used Maruti Suzuki Vehicles. One can buy, sell or exchange used Maruti or non-Maruti vehicles with the help of this service in India. As of 10 August 2017 there are 1,190 outlets across 936 cities.

N2N Fleet Management
N2N is the short form of End to End Fleet Management and provides lease and fleet management to corporates. Clients who have signed up of this service include Gas Authority of India Ltd, DuPont, Reckitt Benckiser, Doordarshan, Singer India, National Stock Exchange of India and Transworld. This fleet management service include Leasing, Maintenance, Convenience services and Remarketing.

Maruti Accessories
Many of the auto component companies, other than Maruti Suzuki, started to offer compatible components and accessories. This caused a serious threat and loss of revenue to Maruti Suzuki. Maruti Suzuki started a new initiative under the brand name Maruti Genuine Accessories to offer accessories like alloy wheels, body cover, carpets, door visors, fog lamps, stereo systems, seat covers and other car care products. These products are sold through dealer outlets and authorized service stations throughout India.

Maruti Driving School

As part of its corporate social responsibility Maruti Suzuki launched the Maruti Driving School in Delhi. Later the services were extended to other cities of India as well. These schools are modelled on international standards, where learners go through classroom and practical sessions. Many international practices like road behaviour and attitudes are also taught in these schools. Before driving actual vehicles participants are trained on simulators.

At the launch ceremony for the school Jagdish Khattar stated "We are very concerned about mounting deaths on Indian roads. These can be brought down if government, industry and the voluntary sector work together in an integrated manner. But we felt that Maruti should first do something in this regard and hence this initiative of Maruti Driving Schools."

Awards and recognition
The Brand Trust Report published by Trust Research Advisory, a brand analytics company, has ranked Maruti Suzuki in the thirty seventh position in 2013 and ninth position in 2019 among the most trusted brands of India.

References and notes

External links
 Official page

Car manufacturers of India
Companies based in New Delhi
Manufacturing companies based in Delhi
Suzuki
Indian subsidiaries of foreign companies
Formerly government-owned companies of India
Vehicle manufacturing companies established in 1981
Indian companies established in 1981
BSE SENSEX
NIFTY 50
1981 establishments in Delhi
Companies listed on the National Stock Exchange of India
Companies listed on the Bombay Stock Exchange